Timothy Ranji is an Anglican bishop in Kenya. He was the Bishop of Mount Kenya South until December 2019 where he handed over to the Rt. Revd. Canon Charles M. Muturi, the current Bishop of this diocese.
He served as Provost, ACK St.James Cathedral Kiambu and as a Priest in this diocese. He has been pivotal in spurring the Mt. Kenya South Diocese to great heights.

References

21st-century Anglican bishops of the Anglican Church of Kenya
Anglican bishops of Mount Kenya South
Year of birth missing (living people)
Living people